Mobilizon is an open source software for event planning and group management, launched in October 2020 by Framasoft to offer a free alternative to the platforms of GAFAM (Facebook, Meetup.com, EventBrite). Mobilizon gained much visibility in hacker circles relatively fast, but also soon within cultural scene in Europe and more recently in the mainstream IT media.

How it works 
The features offered by Mobilizon at the time of the beta launch in October 2019 were:

 creation of accounts, thanks to an email and a password;
 receive notifications by email;
 create and manage multiple identities on the same account;
 create, modify or delete events;
 from the identity you used to create the event;
 with the possibility to create, keep, modify (and delete) events in draft mode;
 with the possibility to manually validate (or refuse) participation requests;
 that you can easily share on your networks or by email;
 that you can add to your calendar.
 You can register to an event by choosing one of your identities;
 report problematic content to the moderator of the forum;
 manage reports of problematic content.

Some instances aim at specific cultural and social impact with the support for multi-lingual communities like the Swiss instance supporting German, French, English, Swiss High German, and Italian language.

History 
On May 14, 2019, the Framasoft association launched a crowdfunding campaign in order, on the one hand, to verify the interest of the community for the project, and on the other hand to ensure the financing itself. At the end of the campaign, on July 10, 2019, the participation goal was reached with more than €58,000 collected.

A test platform was put online on October 15, 2019, to allow people supporting the project to discover the tool and get first impressions from the general public.

The first version is scheduled for the first half of 2020.

On June 22, 2020, when Beta3 is released, Version 1 is pushed back to Fall 2020.

On October 27, 2020, the first version is officially launched.

In 2021, there are 81 Mobilizon instances, in France and abroad, the main ones in terms of users being Mobilizon.fr, Mobilizon.picasoft.net, Mobilize.berlin, Mobilizon.it and Keskonfai.fr.

Technologies 
The software is written in the Elixir programming language with Phoenix, a lightweight framework leveraging Elixir.

The user interface is built with the VueJS framework.

Mobilizon is not a giant platform, but a multitude of interconnected Mobilizon websites, called instances, able to communicate with each other thanks to the ActivityPub protocol, a recent W3C standard. This one also allows to interact with other software composing the fediverse such as Mastodon and PeerTube.

See also 
 Mastodon - microblog using ActivityPub
 PeerTube - Video broadcasting using ActivityPub
 Pixelfed - Image broadcasting
 Framasoft - Association of popular education in digital issues and promotion of free software and culture
 Fediverse - Federation of decentralized services to which Mobilizon belongs

References

External links 
 Mobilizon.org
 Demo site (beta version)
 Official site of the Framasoft association
 Video: Berlin, let's take back control of our events! - Rallying event and community organizers in Berlin to use Mobilizon

Fediverse 
Framasoft